A. maxima may refer to:

 Aerodramus maxima, a cave-nesting swift
 Alcadia maxima, a land snail
 Alucita maxima, a Libyan moth
 Anatoma maxima, a sea snail
 Apamea maxima, a moth native to western North America
 Architectonica maxima, a staircase shell
 Archontophoenix maxima, a palm endemic to Queensland
 Argonauta maxima, a pelagic octopus
 Aristolochia maxima, a New World plant
 Arthrospira maxima, a filamentous cyanobacterion
 Astrantia maxima, a perennial plant
 Atoposea maxima, a Colombian moth